
Year 472 BC was a year of the pre-Julian Roman calendar. At the time, it was known as the Year of the Consulship of Rufus and Fusus (or, less frequently, year 282 Ab urbe condita). The denomination 472 BC for this year has been used since the early medieval period, when the Anno Domini calendar era became the prevalent method in Europe for naming years.

Events 
 By place 
 Greece 
 Carystus in Euboea is forced to join the Delian League after the Athenians attack the city (approximate date).

 By topic 
 Literature 
 The tragedy The Persians is produced by Aeschylus. It is the oldest surviving classical Greek play.

Births 
 Thucydides, Greek historian (d.c. 400 BC)

Deaths

References